Agapanthia fallax is a species of beetle in the family Cerambycidae. It was described by Holzschuh in 1973.

References

fallax
Beetles described in 1973